Glenview Hills is a home rule-class city in Jefferson County, Kentucky, United States. The population was 319 at the 2010 census.

Glenview Hills was named for the nearby community of Glenview, although Glenview Hills was formally incorporated in 1972, more than a decade before the original town received similar recognition.

Geography
Glenview Hills is located in northern Jefferson County at  (38.294169, -85.637954). It is between Glenview to the north and Glenview Manor to the south. Interstate 71 follows the southern border of the community, but there is no direct access.

Demographics

As of the census of 2000, there were 337 people, 133 households, and 115 families residing in the city. The racial makeup of the city was 97.33% White, 1.48% Black or African American, 1.19% from other races. Hispanic or Latino of any race were 2.67% of the population.

There were 133 households, out of which 25.6% had children under the age of 18 living with them, 78.2% were married couples living together, 6.0% had a female householder with no husband present, and 13.5% were non-families. 12.0% of all households were made up of individuals, and 6.8% had someone living alone who was 65 years of age or older. The average household size was 2.53 and the average family size was 2.74.

In the city, the population was spread out, with 19.6% under the age of 18, 3.9% from 18 to 24, 16.0% from 25 to 44, 33.8% from 45 to 64, and 26.7% who were 65 years of age or older. The median age was 51 years. For every 100 females, there were 93.7 males. For every 100 females age 18 and over, there were 90.8 males.

The median income for a household in the city was $109,649, and the median income for a family was $114,914. Males had a median income of $75,000 versus $43,750 for females. The per capita income for the city was $59,069. About 6.6% of families and 9.7% of the population were below the poverty line, including 20.0% of those under age 18 and none of those age 65 or over.

References

External links
City of Glenview Hills

Cities in Jefferson County, Kentucky
Cities in Kentucky
Populated places established in 1972
1972 establishments in Kentucky